Jordyn Barratt (born December 28, 1998) is a regular-footed American skateboarder and surfer. Barratt lives and works in Encinitas, California.

Early life and education
Raised in her early-life in Haleiwa, Hawaii, Barratt eventually moved to California and graduated from San Dieguito Academy in San Diego County, California, where she was captain of her surf team.

Skateboarding
Barratt was a last-minute addition to the Women’s Skateboard Park field at the X-Games 2016. The competition was her first pro contest. The then 17-year-old Barratt earned bronze. In 2016, Barratt became the first female junior pro to compete in both surfing and skating at the VANS U.S. Open. In 2017, Barratt became the first woman to qualify for and compete at the Dew Tour. In 2017, Barratt won the Vans Girls Combi Bowl pool classic.

In 2018,  Barratt placed second at the Vans Park Series women’s skateboard park event in Huntington Beach, California.

Barratt is among the 16 members of the inaugural U.S.A Skateboarding National Team announced in March 2019. Barratt will compete to qualify for the 2020 Tokyo Olympic Games in the Women's Park division.

Sponsors
Toyota, Vans, Pro-Tec, Bones, Independent, Mob Grip, Black & Decker, 187 Pads, Samsung

References

1997 births
Living people
American skateboarders
Female skateboarders
People from Oahu
People from Encinitas, California
X Games athletes
American sportswomen
Skateboarders at the 2020 Summer Olympics
Olympic skateboarders of the United States
21st-century American women
American female surfers